John Osmael Scott-Ellis, 9th Baron Howard de Walden, 5th Baron Seaford TD (27 November 1912 – 10 July 1999) was a British peer, landowner, and a Thoroughbred racehorse owner/breeder.

Life
He was the son of Margarita van Raalte and her husband, Thomas Scott-Ellis, 8th Baron Howard de Walden, whose London home was Seaford House in Belgravia; and he was educated at Eton College and Magdalene College, Cambridge.

In 1931, he moved to Munich to learn a language, where he bought a car. On his first day behind the wheel, he claimed to have knocked over a pedestrian - Adolf Hitler. 
He served in the Territorial Army in the Westminster Dragoons, rising to the rank of major.
He inherited Dean Castle in Kilmarnock, East Ayrshire, Scotland which, along with his father's collections of arms and armour, and his grandfather's collection of musical instruments, he gave to the people of Kilmarnock in 1975.

Marriage and family
He married Irene, Countess von Harrach in 1934, on his honeymoon in 1934, he met Hitler at a concert and spoke of his driving incident.
They had four daughters:
 The Hon. Hazel Czernin, 10th Baroness Howard de Walden (b. 12 Aug 1935)
 The Hon. Susan Buchan (b. 6 Oct 1937)
 The Hon. Jessica White (b. 6 Aug 1941)
 The Hon. Camilla Acloque (b. 1 Apr 1947)

Irene died in 1975, and in 1978, Lord Howard de Walden remarried with Gillian, Lady Mountgarret, 25 years his junior.

Thoroughbred racing
Lord Howard de Walden became involved in the sport of Thoroughbred racing immediately after World War II. In 1958, he bought Lord Derby's Plantation Stud at Exning, just outside Newmarket. A steward of the Jockey Club, he had success in National Hunt hurdle racing with Champion Hurdle winner, Lanzarote.

On the flat, he won the 1985 Epsom Derby with Slip Anchor. Lord Howard de Walden met with considerable success both on the track and in the breeding shed with Kris, who was the 1979 Champion European Miler and 1980 Champion European Older Miler, and who went on to become the Leading sire in Great Britain and Ireland in 1985.

Notes

References 
 
 

1912 births
1999 deaths
People educated at Eton College
Alumni of Magdalene College, Cambridge
British racehorse owners and breeders
Barons Howard de Walden
Seaford, John Scott-Ellis, 5th Baron
Eldest sons of British hereditary barons
20th-century British philanthropists
20th-century English nobility